Chantal Kabasinga is a Rwandan politician and the president of the Association of Widows of Genocide in Rwanda.

Early life 
Kabasinga was born in Gicumbi District in the Northern Province.

Rwandan genocide 
Kabasinga's husband, a Tutsi, was killed in 1994 Rwandan genocide, Kabasinga and her 18-month-old daughter survived.

Career 
As of 2012, Kabasinga was serving her second term as the president of Avega Agahozo, ( in French and Association of Widows of the Genocide in English) in Rwanda after having first been elected in 2008. She also worked as an advisor at the Ruhuka Trauma Center in Kigali. In 2011, in her role as president, she denounced Lantos Foundation for its decision to give a human rights prize to Paul Rusesabagina.

Kabasinga is a member of the Rwanda Patriotic Front and served as a member of parliament in the late 2010s. She ran for the Rwandan senate in 2019.

See also 
 Politics of Rwanda

References 

Living people
Year of birth missing (living people)
Rwandan Patriotic Front politicians
People from Gicumbi District
Genocide survivors
21st-century Rwandan politicians
21st-century Rwandan women politicians
Women activists